Bavishi Fertility Institute is an India based centre for the treatment of infertility and care. The hospital specialises in vitro fertilisation (IVF) and surrogacy. The institute is located in five cities Ahmedabad, Surat, Mumbai, Delhi and Kolkata.

History
Bavishi Fertility Institute began operations in 1986 by a gynaecologist couple Himanshu Bavishi(infertility, Obstetrics and  gynaecologist specialist) and Falguni Bavishi(embryologist specialist). By 1990, they started integrated care maternity home in Ahmedabad. In 1998, “Bavishi IVF Fertility Endoscopy Clinic” was started as a super specialty In vitro fertilisation with the collaboration of Diamond Institute for Infertility and Menopause.

In 2004, they were the western India’s first fertility clinic to introduce Pre Implantation Genetic Diagnosis facility. The institute provides integrated care to patients; the staff is  recognised for their work in treating with infertility.

The institute gained attention when they successfully delivered first child in India with vitrified frozen oocyte technology in 2008. From 2008 to 2018, it has opened 4 more branches in India. In 2014, Himanshu Bavishi ( president of Indian Society for Third Party Assisted Reproduction) co-organised surrogacy walk in Delhi that got the place in the 2015 Limca Book of Records. The institute also organizes infertility seminars with infertility specialists on a regular basis.

Services
Bavishi Fertility Institute focuses only on treatment for Infertility (IVF) and Endoscopy Operations. The institute also offers counseling services and technical support for couples engaging with infertility. The institute receives daily calls and services many couples each year.

References

Hospitals in Gujarat
1986 establishments in Gujarat
Hospitals established in 1986